The terms Battleground of Europe, Battlefield of Europe, and Cockpit of Europe have been used to describe:

World War II Online: Battleground Europe, a 2006 release of the video game World War II Online
Belgium, also known as the "croassroad of Europe".
Italy, especially during the Italian Wars of the Renaissance